A Riemannian submanifold N of a Riemannian manifold M is a submanifold of M equipped with the Riemannian metric inherited from M. The image of an isometric immersion is a Riemannian submanifold.

References

Riemannian manifolds